Maryland Route 471 (MD 471) is a state highway in the U.S. state of Maryland.  Known as Indian Bridge Road, the state highway runs  from Maryland Route 5 north to a crossing of the St. Marys River within Great Mills.  MD 471 was constructed in two segments in the early 1930s.  The second segment near Leonardtown was removed from the state highway system in the mid-1950s but returned as an extension of MD 4 in the early 1980s.

Route description

MD 471 begins at an intersection with MD 5 (Point Lookout Road) and Flat Iron Road in Great Mills. MD 471 passes through the cluster of four buildings that is Cecil's Mill Historic District. The state highway continues northwest, crossing the St. Mary's River twice. MD 471 reaches its northern terminus at the northern end of the second bridge over the river. Indian Bridge Road continues northwest as a county highway toward St. Mary's River State Park and an intersection with MD 4 (St. Andrews Church Road) between Leonardtown and California.

History
MD 471 was constructed in two disjoint segments in 1932: the current length of the state highway along Indian Bridge Road and St. Andrews Church Road between MD 5 and Fairgrounds Road near Leonardtown.  The latter segment of MD 471 was removed from the state highway system in 1956 but returned when MD 4 was extended west from California to Leonardtown in 1982.  The current portion of MD 471 was also transferred to county control in 1956 but returned to the state highway system by 1963.

Junction list

See also

References

External links

MDRoads: MD 471

471
Maryland Route 471